Radomice may refer to the following places in Poland:
Radomice, Lower Silesian Voivodeship (south-west Poland)
Radomice, Kuyavian-Pomeranian Voivodeship (north-central Poland)
Radomice, Greater Poland Voivodeship (west-central Poland)